Compagni, cittadini, fratelli, partigiani / Ortodossia II is a compilation album by the Italian punk rock band CCCP Fedeli alla linea released in 1988. It contains all the tracks from their Ortodossia II and Compagni, Cittadini, Fratelli, Partigiani EPs, both released in 1985.

Track listing 

 "Militanz"
 "Sono come tu mi vuoi"
 "Morire"
 "Emilia paranoica"
 "Live in Pankow"
 "Mi ami?"
 "Spara Jurij"
 "Punk Islam"

Remastering
In 2008 a remastered version was released under the similar name Ortodossia II / Compagni, Cittadini, Fratelli, Partigiani, with the following track list:

Personnel 

 Giovanni Lindo Ferretti – vocals
 Massimo Zamboni – guitar
 Umberto Negri – bass, keyboards, drum machine
 Fatur – Artista del popolo
 Annarella – Benemerita soubrette
 Silvia Bonvicini –

See also
 CCCP discography
 Consorzio Suonatori Indipendenti (C.S.I.)
 Per Grazia Ricevuta (PGR)
 Punk rock

References and footnotes

CCCP Fedeli alla linea albums
1988 compilation albums
Virgin Records compilation albums